Solenopsis abdita is a species of thief ant in the Solenopsis molesta complex, first described in 1989 in Florida. It is native to Florida but may be found in the surrounding states, though this is not confirmed. This species can be hard to differentiate from Solenopsis texana and S. carolinensis, but there are a few minor differences, such as having a longer scape and a wider petiole. Thus, the main method used to distinguish these species primarily uses queens and males, though unfortunately usually only workers are collected, making it difficult to correctly identify this species. S. molesta is known to nest in rotten wood in pine–oak forests, and workers have been collected from leaf litter in said forests.

Etymology 
The species' name abdita is a Latin word meaning "concealed". This is a reference to this species' visual similarity with S. carolinensis and S. texana and others in the molesta complex which makes this species hard to identify and had helped to delay the process of describing the species.

Appearance 
Workers in this species are colored yellow and measure 1.1-1.3mm(0.04-0.05 inches) in length, and are almost identical in appearance to carolinensis and texana, as well as other Floridian species of the molesta complex. Queens appear brown to dark brown, possessing white wings; these reproductive females, along with males, are the main evidence used towards identifying this species, as they are easily distinguishable from reproductive ants of other species.

References

abdita
Insects described in 1989